Livia Reit (born 8 April 1960) is a Romanian cross-country skier. She competed in two events at the 1984 Winter Olympics.

References

External links
 

1960 births
Living people
Romanian female cross-country skiers
Olympic cross-country skiers of Romania
Cross-country skiers at the 1984 Winter Olympics
People from Bran, Brașov